is a Japanese actor best known for his roles as Kojirō in Fūma no Kojirō, Kazuya Suzuki in Kamen Rider Den-O & Kiva: Climax Deka, Takuya Yano in Osananajimi and Yusuke Onodera in Kamen Rider Decade.

Filmography

TV series

 2007 - Fūma no Kojirō (Tokusatsu series, TV Asahi) as Kojirō
 2009 - Kamen Rider Decade (Tokusatsu series, TV Asahi) as Kamen Rider Kuuga/Yusuke Onodera
 2009 - Kamen Rider: Dragon Knight (Tokusatsu series, Toei Channel) voice as Albert Cho/Kamen Rider Spear
 2014 - Kanpai Senshi After V (Tokusatsu parody sitcom), as Red

Film
 2008 - Kamen Rider Den-O & Kiva: Climax Deka (Movie) as Kazuya Suzuki
 2008 - Osananajimi (Movie) as Takuya Yano
 2009 - Kamen Rider Decade: All Riders vs. Dai-Shocker as Kamen Rider Kuuga/Yusuke Onodera
 2009 - Kamen Rider × Kamen Rider W & Decade: Movie War 2010 as Kamen Rider Kuuga/Yusuke Onodera
 2009 - Battle of Demons as Hibiki Horikawa
 2016 - Sanada 10 Braves
 2021 - Rider Time: Kamen Rider Decade VS Zi-O as Yusuke Onodera (A.R. World), Kamen Rider Kuuga/Yusuke Onodera

TV shows

Sengoku Nabe TV(2010-12)
· Kato Yoshiakira from SHICHIHON-Yari 
· Miguel Chijiwa from Tenshō Kennō Shōnen Shisetsu 
· Tsuda Sōgyū from Sakaishū 
· Oda Nobunaga from Nobunaga and Ranmaru 
·  Ōishi Kuranosuke from Forty-seven rōnin  
· Ōyano Yoshiemon from Amakusa Shirō and Shimabara DE midaretai 
· Kobayakawa Takakage at Sengoku Support Center 3

Anime
 2016 - Sengoku Chōjū Giga as Toyotomi Hideyoshi

Game 

 2016 - Kamen Rider: Battride War Genesis (PS4, PS3, PS Vita) as Kamen Rider Kuuga(Yusuke)
 2019 - Kamen Rider Battle GANBARIZING (Arcade Game) as Kamen Rider Kuuga(Onodera)

CD

"Wind and Blaze" as Kojirō, 2007

References

External links
Official Website
Personal blog

Living people
1988 births
People from Tokyo
Japanese male actors